Carmel Pak U Secondary School (Abbreviated as CPU) is a Protestant fundamentalist co-educational secondary school in Tai Po, Hong Kong established in 1979. The current principal is Wong Wai-keung.

School Features

School management
Four committees are founded based on the four areas of growth of Jesus Christ stated in Luke 2:52, "and Jesus increased in wisdom and stature, and in favour with God and man." These four committees, Academic Affairs Committee, Discipline and Moral Education Committee, Religious Activities Committee, and Extra-Curricular Activities Committee, are formed to take care of the development of students in these four areas. Additionally, a committee named Guidance and Award Scheme Committee is formed to guide the students to have a balanced growth in those four areas and to acknowledge their attainments through the Award Scheme.

Facilities
There are 8 devices and 1 screen in every room, including the LCD projector, visualizer, overhead projector, DVD player, videocassette recorder, tape recorder, wireless PA system, air-conditioner and the screen. Computers, clocker and thermometers are also installed in each room in recent years. In addition, cable/wireless broadband network is connected and more than 345 computers are installed throughout the campus. In 2007-2008, free telephone-dialing services are set in each floor for the convenience of students to contact their relatives. In 2013–14, TV screens are added to the entrance of the school. Also, the school bought about 20 Tablets.

Class structures and admission
Students who admitted to the school are all from Band 1 category. In HKCEE 2007, 98.1% of students in the school got five passes (Grade E/Level 2) or above; and 99.5%, 100%, and 97.6% passed in Chinese, English, and Mathematics, respectively. Moreover, 17.5% of students in the school had scored Level 5* in Chinese, which is the highest percentage among Hong Kong secondary schools in HKCEE 2007. Over the years, many have even scored 7 or 8 distinctions in the HKCEE and 4 or 5 distinctions in HKALE. The school is among the few schools that have three F.6 classes. All of the F.6 places are filled up by the own graduates of the school. Last year, 95.5% of our F.7 graduates were admitted to universities through JUPAS, while 3 F.6 students were admitted through Early Admission Scheme.

Junior Form (F.1–F.3)

Students places
 F.1 admission places: 144
 4 class in each form
 about 36 students at 1 class

Subjects offered
 Biblical Knowledge
Chinese Language
English Language
Mathematics
 Integrated Science
Computer Literacy
Putonghua
Chinese History
Economics & Public Affairs
Geography
History
Design & Technology
Home Economics
Visual Arts
Music
Physical Education

Senior Form (F.4-F.6)

Subject offered (Core)
 Chinese Language
 English Language
 Mathematics (with/without elective module 2)
Liberal Studies

Subject offered (Elective)
 Chinese Literature
 Chinese History
 Economics
 Geography
 History
Biology
Chemistry
Physics
 Combined Science
 Information & Communication Technology
Business, Accounting and Financial Studies

Academic Affairs Committee

Society
 Chinese Society
 English Society
 Mathematics Society
 Science Society
 Computer Society
 History Society
 Social Science Society
 Liberal Studies Society

School Team
 Mathematics Team (Junior/Senior)
 Chinese Debating Team (Junior/Senior)
 English Debating Team
 General QA Team
 Putonghua Team

Students Services Team
 Student Librarians
 Book-packing Group
 Environmental Ambassador

Interest Group
 Putonghua Interest Group (For Senior Form Students)
 Electronic Models Class
 Astronomy Interest Group

Discipline and Moral Education Committee

Voluntary Services
 Community Youth Club (CYC)

Students Services Team
 Prefect

Religious Activities Committee

Assembly
 Gospel Fortnight (Traditional Chinese: 福音雙週)
Christian Fellowship

Team
 Gospel Team

Extra-Curricular Activities Committee

Music

Choir
The Choirs in Carmel Pak U Secondary School won many prizes during the music festival these years.
 Junior Girls Choir
 Junior Mixed Choir
 Senior Boys Choir
 Senior Girls Choir
 Senior Mixed Choir

Handbell Choir
 Junior Handbell Choir
 Senior Handbell Choir

Chinese Orchestra

Orchestra

Art

Physical Education

Basketball team

Soccer team

Volleyball team

Famous alumni
 Dr. Yuen Man Fung (The 35th Ten Outstanding Young Person Selection Awardee, JCIHK)
 Elkie Chong (Chong Ting Yan), former TVB child actress and member of Korean girl group CLC
 Serrini (Leung Ka Yun),a independent singer in Hong Kong

See also
 Education in Hong Kong
 List of secondary schools in Hong Kong

References

External links
 Official Website 
 School Profile @ HKEdCity

Educational institutions established in 1979
1979 establishments in Hong Kong
Protestant secondary schools in Hong Kong
Schools in the New Territories
Tai Po